The Land Run of 1891 was a set of horse races to settle land acquired by the federal government through the opening of several small Indian reservations in Oklahoma Territory. The race involved approximately 20,000 homesteaders, who gathered to stake their claims on 6,097 plots, of  each, of former reservation land.

The settlement that took place in September 1891 included three land runs. On September 22, 1891, a land run was held to settle Iowa, Sac and Fox, Potawatomi, and Shawnee lands. A September 23, 1891, land run was held to settle Tecumseh, the predesignated location of the county seat of County B, later renamed as Pottawatomie County. Finally, on September 28, 1891, a land run was held to settle Chandler, the predesignated location of the county seat of County A, later renamed as Lincoln County.

These land runs also expanded Payne, Logan, Oklahoma, and Cleveland counties.

Background
The Indian reservation land was broken up through allotment following a proclamation by President Benjamin Harrison. Members of the tribe each received  of land. Once tribe members had each received an allotment, the remaining land was declared surplus, purchased from those tribes and put on the block for sale to settlers who took part in the land run at $1.25 per acre. The Iowa tribe settled for eighty-acre allotments for each of its 86 members and sold the remaining  as "surplus" at less than $0.28 per acre. The Sac and Fox agreed to accept 160 acres per member and sold  at $1.25 per acre. The Citizen Band Potawatomi agreed with the 160-acres per member for 1,498 members. The Absentee Shawnee took 569 allotments and sold the remaining  at $0.68 per acre. The Kickapoo tribe did not agree to take their allotments at this time, so their land was not opened until 1895.

September 22 run
Before noon on September 22, 1891, a large number ("thousands") of would-be settlers lined up at various starting points along the western border of the Creek Nation. These points included Oklahoma City, Norman, and Guthrie. No land offices had been established inside the run area (a major change from the 1889 run), so claimants had to travel back to Guthrie or Oklahoma City in order to file their claims. 

Two new counties were formed in Oklahoma Territory from the newly-open area: County A (later named Lincoln County) and County B (later named Pottowatomie County). Lands within the boundaries of the two new county seats (Chandler and Tecumseh, respectively) were excluded from this run, allegedly because the towns had not been platted.

Notes

References

See also
 Land Run of 1889
 Land Run of 1892
 Land Run of 1893
 Land Run of 1895

Pre-statehood history of Oklahoma
History of United States expansionism
Oklahoma Territory
Populated places established in 1891
September 1891 events